Payam Airport  is an international airport located in Karaj,  from Tehran, in the Alborz Province of Iran. The airport was established in 1990, but was not opened officially until 1997. Payam Aviation Services Co. operates the airport as part of Payam Special Economic Zone. Payam Air previously operated an air mail hub at the airport.

The airport has served primarily as cargo field. Commercial passenger services start on 14 September 2018 (23 Sharivar 1397 AP). The first flight was a Taban Air service from Mashhad International Airport and to this day it is the only passenger flight operating from the airport.

Airlines and destinations

Commercial agents 
Ashena Courier Co. (ACC)

References 

Airports in Iran
Buildings and structures in Alborz Province
Transportation in Alborz Province